The Paul Bley Synthesizer Show is an album by Paul Bley performing compositions by Annette Peacock which was released on the Milestone label in 1971.

Reception

Allmusic awarded the album 4 stars noting that "Removed several decades from the initial hoopla about electronic instruments, this music can really be appreciated as a stunning document of Bley in action, bringing past and present aspects of his creativity into something new, developing right in front of the musicians that he gets such superb performances out of".

Track listing
All compositions by Annette Peacock
 "Mr. Joy" - 4:30   
 "The Archangel" - 6:46   
 "Nothing Ever Was, Anyway" - 6:50   
 "Gary" - 4:28   
 "Snakes" - 6:49   
 "Parks" - 6:07   
 "Circles" - 4:08   
Recorded at Advantage Studios in New York City on December 9, 1970 (tracks 2, 6 & 7), January 21, 1971 (tracks 1, 3 & 4) and March 9, 1971 (tracks 3 & 5).

Personnel 
Paul Bley - piano, ARP synthesizer, RMI electric piano
Glen Moore  (tracks 1, 3 & 4),  Frank Tusa (tracks 3 & 5), Dick Youngstein (tracks 2, 6 & 7) - bass 
Steve Hass (tracks 1–4, 6 & 7), Bobby Moses (tracks 3 & 5) - drums

References 

1971 albums
Paul Bley albums
Milestone Records albums
Albums produced by Orrin Keepnews